The 1978 Montana State Bobcats football team was an American football team that represented Montana State University in the Big Sky Conference during the 1978 NCAA Division I-AA football season. In their first season under head coach Sonny Lubick, the Bobcats compiled an 8–2 record (4–2 against Big Sky opponents) and tied for second place in the Big Sky.

Schedule

References

Montana State
Montana State Bobcats football seasons
Montana State Bobcats football